The 1942 New York Yankees season was the team's 40th season. The team finished with a record of 103–51, winning their 13th pennant, finishing 9 games ahead of the Boston Red Sox. New York was managed by Joe McCarthy. The Yankees played home games at Yankee Stadium. In the World Series, they lost to the St. Louis Cardinals in 5 games.

Regular season

Season standings

Record vs. opponents

Roster

Player stats

Batting

Starters by position
Note: Pos = Position; G = Games played; AB = At bats; H = Hits; Avg. = Batting average; HR = Home runs; RBI = Runs batted in

Other batters
Note: G = Games played; AB = At bats; H = Hits; Avg. = Batting average; HR = Home runs; RBI = Runs batted in

Pitching

Starting pitchers
Note: G = Games pitched; IP = Innings pitched; W = Wins; L = Losses; ERA = Earned run average; SO = Strikeouts

Other pitchers
Note: G = Games pitched; IP = Innings pitched; W = Wins; L = Losses; ERA = Earned run average; SO = Strikeouts

Relief pitchers
Note: G = Games pitched; W = Wins; L = Losses; SV = Saves; ERA = Earned run average; SO = Strikeouts

1942 World Series

NL St. Louis Cardinals (4) vs. AL New York Yankees (1)

Farm system

LEAGUE CHAMPIONS: Butler

Notes

References
1942 New York Yankees at Baseball Reference
1942 World Series
1942 New York Yankees team page at www.baseball-almanac.com

New York Yankees seasons
New York Yankees
New York Yankees
1940s in the Bronx
American League champion seasons